Dendrophilia saxigera is a moth of the family Gelechiidae. It was first described by Edward Meyrick in 1931. It is found in China (Sichuan, Hunan) and Japan.

References

saxigera
Moths described in 1931
Moths of Japan